Melanargia epimede is an east Palaearctic species of satyrine butterfly found in eastern Mongolia, northeastern China, Korea and Japan. The larva on feeds on Agrostis clavata.

Description in Seitz: "meridionalis Fldr. (= epimede Stgr. (39 c) is a large form which is broadly black above and appears to occur chiefly at Ning-po and Kiu-kiang. The ocelli of the underside especially are enormously developed. — An aberration which is melanotic on both surfaces, bearing only reduced whitish smears between the veins on the otherwise quite dark wings, is ab. lugens Honr. (39 d); it is known from Central China."

References

Melanargia
Butterflies described in 1892
Butterflies of Asia
Butterflies of Europe